The Briar Street Theatre is a theatre located in Chicago, Illinois, and is home to the long-running Blue Man Group. Originally the carriage house for the Marshall Field and Company horses, the space was purchased by Walter Topel and reconstructed into a theater. The Briar Street Theatre is most notably associated with the Blue Man Group act, which began performing at the Briar Street Theatre in 1997 and, as of March 20, 2022, is still performing there.

History 

Built in 1901, the space was used as the stables where the horses used and owned by Marshall Field's would stay.  These horses were used for the company's delivery service. As time passed, the lot became useless and in 1970, Walt Topel, founder of Topel and Associated, Ltd., bought the building from Werner Kennelly Moving and Storage Company and redesigned it into a sound stage and office where his film production company would thrive from.  From 1977 to 1985, this building also housed Walt Topel's post-production company, Cinetronics, Ltd.  This business was later renamed Swell and moved downtown in 1984. In 1985, the theater was reopened and became a part of the culture of Chicago.  Today, the Topel family is still the owner of the venue and the original second floor actually hangs from the ceiling by large turnbuckles that can still be seen.

Notable performers 

The Briar Street Theatre has hosted many performers:
 Mickey Rooney: Mickey Rooney was an America film actor and entertainer whose film, television, and stage appearances spanned nearly his entire lifetime. During his career he won multiple awards, including an Academy Award, a Golden Globe and an Emmy Award. Best known for his work as the Andy Hardy character, Rooney had one of the longest careers of any actor.
 Veronica Hamel: Veronica Hamel is an American actress. Hamel is probably best remembered for her role in Hill Street Blues. In recent years, Hamel had a recurring role in the NBC television series Third Watch and appeared in the ABC series Lost.
 Sada Thompson: Sada Thompson has been nominated for 3 Golden Globes and has been nominated 8 times for an Oscar and has won 1. She has also won Broadway's 1972 Tony Award as Best Actress (Dramatic) for Twigs.
 Ellen Burstyn: Ellen Burstyn is an Academy Award-winning American actress. Burstyn was nominated for an Emmy Award for Outstanding Actress in a Miniseries or Special, for the TV movie The People vs. Jean Harris (1981) and again for another TV movie, Pack of Lies (1987). In 2006, she was nominated for an Emmy for Outstanding Supporting Actress in a Miniseries or Special for HBO's Mrs. Harris as Dr. Tarnower's "Ex-Lover #3".
 Dorothy Loudon: Dorothy was an American actress noted for her comedy and belting singing voice, which she used to deliver a wide range of musical comedy and songs of the Roaring Twenties. In 1982 she won the Sarah Siddons Award for her work in Chicago theatre. Her best-remembered role is as evil orphanage administrator Miss Hannigan in Annie, for which she won the Tony Award for Best Actress in 1977.
 Shelley Berman: Shelley Berman was an American actor and was nominated once for an Emmy and nominated once for the Screen Actors Guild Awards.
 Betty Buckley: Betty Buckley is an American actress and has had 2 Daytime Emmy nominations and 1 TV Land Award nomination.
 George Segal: George Segal, Jr. (February 13, 1934 – March 23, 2021) was an American actor of stage and screen.

The venue also has artworks within the lobby created by artists such as Van Gogh, Brancusi, Stanton, Picasso, and the Blue Man Group.

Current productions

Blue Man Group

The Blue Man Group is a group of three bald men dressed in black clothing with the remaining showing skin painted blue. The Blue Man Group formed in the late 1980s and have performed in many major cities. Inside, PVC pipes cover the walls and ceilings as well as digital screens that play unique messages. In the actual theater, there are elements such as paint, PVC based instruments, L.E.D. visuals, a human paint project, and Cap'n Crunch cereal, among other elements. The first five rows are labeled "Poncho Seats" that provide ponchos to protect the audience members from things coming from the stage. There is also an element known as the "late alarm" that will be set off when an audience member walks in late.

Past productions 
Since the opening of the Briar Street Theatre, singers have not been the only performances held. Other noteworthy productions hosted at the theater have been run by Fox Theatricals and have included the following:
 Driving Miss Daisy: An elderly Jewish widow living in Atlanta can no longer drive. Her son insists she allow him to hire a driver, which in the 1950s meant a black man. She resists any change in her life but, Hoke, the driver is hired by her son. She refuses to allow him to drive her anywhere at first, but Hoke slowly wins her over with his native good graces. The movie is directly taken from a stage play and does show it. It covers over twenty years of the pair's life together as they slowly build a relationship that transcends their differences.
 Laughter on the 21st Floor
 Having Our Say: A story of Sadie and Bessie Delany, two African-American (they preferred "colored") sisters who both lived past the age of 100. They grew up on a North Carolina college campus, the daughters of the first African-American Episcopal bishop, who was born a slave, and a woman with an inter-racial background. With the support of each other and their family, they survived encounters with racism and sexism in their own different ways. Sadie quietly and sweetly broke barriers to become the first African-American home-ec teacher in New York City, while Bessie, with her own brand of outspokenness, became the second African-American dentist in New York City. At the ages of 103 and 101, they told their story to Amy Hill Hearth, a white New York Times reporter who published an article about them. The overwhelming response launched a bestselling book, a Broadway play, and this film.
 Jackie Mason's Politically Incorrect: Political talk show based on the idea that debate is stifled by too much seriousness. Guests are chosen from the worlds of politics and entertainment, often with the goal of creating conflict (ultra-sensitive special-interest groups matched with outrageous comedians). Nevertheless, a relatively friendly atmosphere is maintained, with none of the swearing or chair-throwing common on 'shock-talk' shows. Regular features have included the "Get Over Yourself" award, given to the week's most self-absorbed public figure.
 Steve Martin's Picasso at the Lapin Agile: Picasso at the Lapin Agile is a play written by Steve Martin in 1993. It features the characters of Albert Einstein and Pablo Picasso, who meet at a bar called the Lapin Agile (Nimble Rabbit) in Montmartre, Paris. It is set on October 8, 1904, and both men are on the verge of an amazing idea (Einstein will publish his special theory of relativity in 1905 and Picasso will paint Les Demoiselles d'Avignon in 1907) when they find themselves at the Lapin Agile, where they have a lengthy debate about the value of genius and talent while interacting with a host of other characters.
 Concerts by Barbara Cook: Barbara Cook is a Tony Award-winning American singer and actress.

Layout and features 

The theater has 625 seats. The dimensions of the Briar Street Theater's stage is a proscenium of 38'w x 20', a width of 36'4", a depth of 32', and a height of 23' to grid. The theater is also wheelchair accessible and offers closed-circuit headsets.

Notes

References 

http://www.theatreinchicago.com/theatredetail.php?theatreID=82
http://www.gotickets.com/venues/il/briar_street_theater.php
https://web.archive.org/web/20090303151326/http://chicago.metromix.com/theater/theater/briar-street-theatre-chicago/136277/content
https://web.archive.org/web/20090104005901/http://www.foxtheatricals.com/briar-street.htm
http://gochicago.about.com/od/chicagotheaterproductions/p/blue_man.htm
https://web.archive.org/web/20090221094259/http://www.ticketluck.com/venues/Briar-Street-Theatre/index.php
http://www.theatermania.com/chicago/theaters/briar-street-theater_321/
https://web.archive.org/web/20090216015422/http://www.blueman.com/popups/15

Theatres in Chicago